The 2017 Gree China Cup International Football Championship was the inaugural edition of the China Cup, an international football tournament. It was held from 10 to 15 January 2017 in Nanning, Guangxi, China.

The tournament was hosted by the Chinese Football Association, Wanda Sports Holdings, Guangxi Zhuang Autonomous Region Sports Bureau and the Nanning Municipal Government, and sponsored by Gree Electric.

Participants
In November 2016, the participants were announced.

Venue

Match officials
The following referees were chosen for the 2017 China Cup.
Referees

  Fu Ming
  Ma Ning
  Kim Jong-hyeok
  Ko Hyung-jin

Assistant referees

  Cao Yi
  Ma Ji
  Kim Young-ha
  Yoon Kwang-yeol

Squads
Age, caps and goals as of the start of the tournament, 10 January 2017.

Matches
The official draw was announced on 7 December 2016. All times are local, CST (UTC+8).

Bracket

Semi-finals

Third-place playoff

Final

Goalscorers
1 goal

 Wang Jingbin
 César Pinares
 Ángelo Sagal
 Franko Andrijašević
 Luka Ivanušec
 Aron Sigurðarson
 Kjartan Finnbogason

References

2017
2017 in association football
Sport in Guangxi
Nanning
2017 in Chinese football
January 2017 sports events in China
International association football competitions hosted by China